Heathcote Brook, also known as Heathcote Run, is a tributary of the Millstone River in central New Jersey in the United States.

Course
It runs through a residential area and crosses Route 1. It runs parallel to Route 1, picking up several tributaries until it crosses Route 1.

Accessibility
Numerous road crossings make it easily accessible.

Tributaries
Carters Brook
Heathcote Brook Branch

Sister tributaries
Beden Brook
Bear Brook
Cranbury Brook
Devils Brook
Harrys Brook
Indian Run Brook
Little Bear Brook
Millstone Brook
Peace Brook
Rocky Brook
Royce Brook
Simonson Brook
Six Mile Run
Stony Brook
Ten Mile Run
Van Horn Brook

See also
List of rivers of New Jersey

References

External links
USGS Coordinates in Google Maps

Rivers of New Jersey
Tributaries of the Raritan River
Rivers of Middlesex County, New Jersey